— Line 8, coloured pink (termini: Plaça Espanya – Molí Nou-Ciutat Cooperativa) and operated by FGC, is part of the Barcelona Metro network, and therefore of the  larger ATM fare-integrated transport system. It joins Plaça Espanya, in the Sants-Montjuïc district of Barcelona with metropolitan area municipalities of L'Hospitalet de Llobregat, Cornellà de Llobregat and Sant Boi de Llobregat.

Overview 
The pink line, mostly underground, links Plaça Espanya, in Barcelona proper, with Sant Boi de Llobregat, through L'Hospitalet de Llobregat. It opened in 1912 as a narrow gauge train line (hence predating the first metro Line 3 by 12 years), and was known as S3 until 2003, hence the name of its suburban extended line (S33). It's also part of the Llobregat-Anoia and Metro del Baix Llobregat railway networks run by FGC, from which trains continue from Molí Nou-Ciutat Cooperativa onwards. There is also a freight-only branch line before Sant Boi station that connects to the Port of Barcelona.

The line first took on its current form between 1985 and 1987 when the section Cornellà-Riera – Sant Josep was first moved underground, followed by the section Sant Josep – Espanya. In 1997 Magòria-La Campana station opened, followed by Molí Nou – Ciutat Cooperativa station in 2000.

An extension of the line further into central Barcelona, with a new station in Plaça Francesc Macià, has been discussed since May 1999. The project was finally approved by the government of Catalonia in 2021, with the final alignment serving the stations Espanya, Hospital Clínic, Francesc Macià and Gràcia.
It will link both the metro and suburban services of the line with Trambaix routes T1, T2 and T3, Line 5 of the Barcelona Metro and the Vallès line. Preliminary works have already started as of 2022, with tunneling slated to begin in 2023. The extension is expected to be operational by 2028.
The line is also projected to extend further towards the Besós river, serving stations such as Joanic, Sagrada Familia and Glòries.

Technical details 

 Colour on map: pink
 Number of stations: 11
 Type: Conventional metro (mixed traffic with suburban commuter train lines)
 Length: 
 Rolling stock: Series 213
 Journey time: 30 minutes
 Track gauge: 
 Traction: Electricity
 Electrification: Overhead wire, 1,500 V DC
 Open-air sections: Yes (Between Cornellà-Riera and Molí Nou-Ciutat Cooperativa)
 Mobile phone coverage: All line
 Depots: Martorell (on Llobregat–Anoia line), Sant Boi sidings
 Operator: FGC

Current stations 

Plaça Espanya (L1, L3)
Magòria-La Campana
Ildefons Cerdà
Europa-Fira (L9)
Gornal (RENFE)
Sant Josep
Avinguda Carrilet (L1)
Almeda
Cornellà-Riera
Sant Boi
Molí Nou-Ciutat Cooperativa

References

External links 
Article on the Catalan Wikipedia
Line 8 at Trenscat.com
Line 8 at TransporteBCN.es

8
Llobregat–Anoia Line
Transport in Sants-Montjuïc
Transport in L'Hospitalet de Llobregat
Transport in Cornellà de Llobregat
Transport in Sant Boi de Llobregat
Metre gauge railways in Spain